This is the list of cathedrals in the Netherlands sorted by denomination.

Roman Catholic 

Cathedrals of the Roman Catholic Church in the Netherlands:
 Cathedral Basilica of St. John in 's-Hertogenbosch
 Cathedral of St. Anthony of Padua in Breda
 Cathedral of St. Joseph in Groningen
 Cathedral Basilica of St. Bavo in Haarlem
 Cathedral of St. Christopher in Roermond
 Cathedral of St. Lawrence and St. Elizabeth in Rotterdam
 Cathedral of St. Catherine in Utrecht
 Cathedral Queen of the Most Holy Rosary in Willemstad, Curacao

Old Catholic
Old Catholic cathedrals in the Netherlands:
 Cathedral Church of St. Gertrude in Utrecht
 Cathedral Church of St. Anna and Mary in Haarlem

See also
Lists of cathedrals by country

References

Netherlands
Cathedral
Cathedrals